The River Lyvennet is a river flowing through the county of Cumbria in England.

The source of the Lyvennet (as Lyvennet Beck) is to be found close to Robin Hood's Grave on Crosby Ravensworth Moor, an area rich in ancient remains.

From there, the beck flows northwards through Crosby Ravensworth, Mauld's Meaburn and King's Meaburn, emerging as the River Lyvennet.

The river is joined by the River Leith shortly before the Lyvennet's own confluence with the River Eden.

Several Pedigree cattle herds are named after the river including Lyvennet Simmentals of Greystone House, King's Meaburn.

The Lyvennet valley may preserve the name of Taliesin's "Llwyfenydd"  and would thus be associated with the post-Roman Brythonic kingdom of Rheged. The meaning of the Welsh word "llwyfen" is the elm tree.

References

Lyvennet, River
1Lyvennet